Lou Clare (March 13, 1950 - August 21, 2017) was a Canadian football defensive back and linebacker who played nine seasons in the Canadian Football League, mainly for the Saskatchewan Roughriders.

External links 
Career stats
Obituary

1950 births
2017 deaths
Canadian football defensive backs
Canadian football linebackers
Hamilton Tiger-Cats players
Minnesota Golden Gophers football players
Montreal Alouettes players
Players of Canadian football from Ontario
Saskatchewan Roughriders players
Sportspeople from Mississauga